Los Ranchos may refer to:

Los Ranchos, California
Los Ranchos de Albuquerque, New Mexico